Aleksei Yuryevich Glushkov (born March 9, 1975) is a Russian wrestler and Olympic bronze medalist in Greco-Roman wrestling.

References

External links
 

1975 births
Living people
Olympic wrestlers of Russia
Wrestlers at the 2000 Summer Olympics
Russian male sport wrestlers
Olympic bronze medalists for Russia
Martial artists from Moscow
Olympic medalists in wrestling
Medalists at the 2000 Summer Olympics